Le Cheshire Cat et moi is Nolwenn Leroy's third album. It was released on 7 December 2009.

Track listing
 "Le Cheshire cat" – 3:40
 "Faut-il, faut-il pas ?" – 2:45
 "Mademoiselle de la gamellee" – 2:49
 "Feel good" – 3:04
 "Cauchemar" – 4:28
 "Valse au sommet" – 3:23
 "Parfaitement insaisissable" – 3:51
 "You get me" – 4:14
 "Textile schizophrène" – 3:16
 "Amis des jours de pluie" – 3:10
 "Safe and sound" – 3:29
 "Ici c'est moi qui commande" (Collectors Edition) – 2:44
 "Aucune idée" (Collectors Edition) – 2:51
 "Me and you" (iTunes exclusive) – 3:20

Certifications

Charts

References

2009 albums
Nolwenn Leroy albums
French-language albums
Universal Music France albums
Mercury Records albums